Hussein Aljunied (1943 – 5 March 2016), also called Habib, was a Singaporean football player and manager. He was high respected as the national head coach of both Singapore and Brunei throughout the 1980s and 90s.

Managerial career 
In charge of the Singapore national team from 1984 to 1986. He guided the team to both the Southeast Asian (SEA) Games Final and the Malaysia League championship in 1985. In the 1985 Merlion Cup, he also guided Singapore to a joint championship victory with Yugoslavia. After his management in his home country, he had a managerial stint with the Brunei national team from 1990 until 1992. Only two matches were completed during his time in Brunei, each ending in a draw and defeat against the Philippines in 1991.

International career 
Habib was the national team's captain in 1971.

Personal life and death 
Habib was fans of both Manchester United and Manchester City. He had previously served with the Singapore Army as a warrant officer. 

Habib had reportedly been warded at the Singapore General Hospital while suffering from a severe lung illness due to pneumonia, kidney failure and a weak heart. The former head coach died on 5 March 2016, leaving behind his wife, son, three daughters, and ten grandkids. Prayers were held at Sultan Mosque, where several football figures attended. President of the Asian Football Confederation (AFC), Salman bin Ibrahim Al Khalifa, sent his condolences.

Honours 

 Liga Malaysia: 1985

References 

1943 births
2016 deaths
Singaporean footballers
Singapore international footballers
Singapore FA players
Singapore national football team managers
Singaporean football managers
Warriors FC head coaches
Singapore Premier League head coaches
Association football midfielders
Association football forwards